Dumoga is a genus of Southeast Asian dwarf spiders that was first described by Alfred Frank Millidge & A. Russell-Smith in 1992.  it contains only three species: D. arboricola, D. buratino, and D. complexipalpis.

See also
 List of Linyphiidae species (A–H)

References

Araneomorphae genera
Linyphiidae
Spiders of Asia